This is a list of schools in Daxing District, Beijing.

Secondary schools
Note: In China the word 中学 zhōng​xué, literally translated as "middle school", refers to any secondary school and differs from the American usage of the term "middle school" to mean specifically a lower secondary school or junior high school. 初中 chū​zhōng is used to refer to a lower secondary school.

  (北京市第二中学) Yizhuang School (亦庄学校) - North Campus (北校区) and South Campus (南校区)
 Beijing No. 8 High School Daxing Branch School (大兴分校) and Yizhuang Branch School (亦庄分校)
  (北京市第十四中学) Daxing Anding Branch School (大兴安定分校)
 Beijing Jingshan School Daxing Experimental School (北京景山学校大兴实验学校)
 Beijing Normal University Daxing Affiliated High School (北京师范大学大兴附属中学) - East Campus (东校区)
 Beijing Yinzhuang Experimental School (北京亦庄实验中学)
 Beijing City Daxing District Jinhai School (北京市大兴区金海学校)
 Beijing City Daxing District Xinghai School (北京市大兴区兴海学校)
 Beijing City Daxing District Yonghua Experimental School (北京市大兴区永华实验学校)
 Beijing City Daxing District No. 1 High School (北京市大兴区第一中学) - Main Campus, and North Campus (北校区)
 Beijing City Daxing District No. 3 High School (北京市大兴区第三中学)
 Beijing City Daxing District No. 4 High School (北京大兴区第四中学)
 Beijing City Daxing District No. 6 High School (北京市大兴区第六中学)
 Beijing City Daxing District No. 7 High School (北京市大兴区第七中学) - East Campus (东校区) and West Campus (西校区)
 Beijing City Daxing District Caiyu High School  (北京市大兴区采育中学)
 Beijing City Daxing District Daxinzhuang High School (北京市大兴区大辛庄中学)
 Beijing City Daxing District Demao High School (北京市大兴区德茂中学)
 Beijing City Daxing District Dingfuzhuang High School (北京市大兴区定福庄中学)
 Beijing City Daxing District Fashang High School (北京市大兴区垡上中学)
 Beijing City Daxing District Fengheying High School (北京市大兴区凤河营中学)
 Beijing City Daxing District Guojiawu High School (北京市大兴区郭家务中学)
 Beijing City Daxing District Hongxing High School (北京市大兴区红星中学)
 Beijing City Daxing District Jiugong High School (北京市大兴区旧宫中学)
 Daxing District Langfa High School (大兴区狼垡中学)
 Beijing City Daxing District Lixian Ethnic High School (北京市大兴区礼贤民族中学)
 Beijing City Daxing District Panggezhuang High School (北京市大兴区庞各庄中学)
 Beijing City Daxing District Qingyundian High School (北京市大兴区青云店中学)
 Beijing City Daxing District Suncun High School (北京市大兴区孙村中学)
 Beijing City Daxing District Taihe High School  (北京市大兴区太和中学)
 Beijing City Daxing District Weishanzhuang High School (北京市大兴区魏善庄中学)
 Beijing City Daxing District Xinghua High School (北京市大兴区兴华中学) - Main Campus and Yangshan Campus (仰山校区)
 Beijing City Daxing District Yufa High School (北京市大兴区榆垡中学)
 Beijing City Daxing District Zhangziying High School (北京市大兴区长子营中学)
 Beijing Normal University Daxing Affiliated High School (北京师范大学大兴附属中学)
 Beijing University of Civil Engineering and Architecture Affiliated High School (北京建筑大学附属中学) - Main Campus and New Campus (新校区)
  (首都师范大学附属中学) - Daxing North Campus (大兴北校区) and Daxing South Campus (大兴南校区) - Affiliated with Capital Normal University
 Capital Normal University Daxing Affiliated High School (首都师范大学大兴附属中学)
  Affiliated Experimental School (国家教育行政学院附属实验学校)

Primary schools

References

Daxing
Schools